Falso Amor (also known as Casas de Carton) is the debut studio album released by Los Bukis in 1975. After signing with Discos Melody in Mexico. Note: "Casas de Carton" was taken out of later publications of this album due to its controversial nature, being replaced by a cover of King Clave song "Los Hombres No Deben Llorar" as the first song.

Track listing

All songs written and composed by Marco Antonio Solís, except where otherwise noted.

References

1975 debut albums
Los Bukis albums